The 2022 New Zealand local elections were triennial elections held in New Zealand on Saturday 8 October 2022. Voting began by postal vote on 16 September and ended at noon on 8 October 2022.

Election schedule
Key dates relating to the general election were as follows:

Issues

Low candidate numbers
In early August 2022, Local Government New Zealand (LGNZ) and several local councils including Central Otago District Council, Greater Wellington Regional Council, Hastings District Council, Mackenzie District Council, Nelson City Council, Otago Regional Council, Environment Southland, Queenstown Lakes District Council, Rangitikei District Council, South Waikato District Council, and Rotorua Lakes Council expressed concern about the low number of candidates standing for wards, council seats, and mayoral offices. For example, the Mackenzie District Council reported only three nominations for a total of 19 vacancies.

LGNZ President Stuart Crosby attributed the low number of candidates to several factors including abusive rhetoric directed against electoral officials on issues such as the Three Waters reform programme and resource management reform, and low renumeration rates which disadvantaged candidates from young and diverse communities in rural and provincial areas. Local government consultant Peter McKinlay identified central government pressure on local councils, compliance requirements, and changes to governing arrangements since the 1980s as factors discouraging people from standing for local government positions.

Low voter turnout
The 2022 local elections reported a record low voter turnout across the country. By 28 September, Auckland had reported a voter turnout of 8.8%, 10.9% in Christchurch, 4.9% in Wellington, 3.9% in Taupō, and 19.8% in the Westland District. Low voter turnout was also reported in other urban centres and regions including Dunedin, Invercargill, Nelson, Rotorua, Queenstown, the Northland Region, South Canterbury, and the New Plymouth District. Auckland University of Technology political scientist Julienne Molineaux attributed the low voter turnout to public interest in the death of Queen Elizabeth II, the long weekend, a long voting period, and public disengagement with postal voting due to insufficient posting infrastructure. In response to low voter turnout, Auckland mayoral candidates Efeso Collins and Wayne Brown advocated scrapping the postal voter system in favour of online voting.

In late September 2022, Radio New Zealand and The Spinoff reported that several voters including Local Government Minister Nanaia Mahuta were experiencing delays in receiving their postal ballot papers. According to Radio New Zealand, most local councils hired private companies to manage their elections. One Northland electoral official advocated transferring management of local elections to the Electoral Commission, which manages the triennial general elections.

By 9 October, The New Zealand Herald reported that the national voter turnout for the 2022 local elections was a record low 36 percent. Voter turnout in local body elections had declined in New Zealand over the past 25 years since 1989, which recorded a national voter turnout of 57%. In response, Local Government New Zealand President Stuart Crosby, Prime Minister Jacinda Ardern, and National Party leader Christopher Luxon called for an independent review and urgent reform to the voting system for local elections.

On 28 October, the Future for Local Government group advocated several recommendations aimed at improving voter turnout at future local body elections including lowering the voting age to 16 years old, four-year terms, raising salaries for elected local officials, implementing the single transferable voting system nationwide, and improving engagement with the public particularly Māori voters.

Entryism
In mid–August 2022, Stuff and the Guardian Australia reported that the anti-vaccination group Voices for Freedom (VFF) had encouraged its members to contest the 2022 local elections with the intention of infiltrating local government bodies in order to make  New Zealand "ungovernable" at the local government level. VFF candidates were instructed to conceal their affiliation with the group when running as candidates. Victoria University of Wellington political scientist Dr Mona Krewel expressed concern that VFF candidates could be elected due to the low number of candidates and possible low voter turnout.

Notable VFF-affiliated candidates have included Teviot Valley Community Board candidate Gill Booth, Southland dairy farmer Jaspreet Bopara, Dunedin coordinators Watson and Tracey Pita, Christchurch City Council candidates Sally Cogle and Mike Wilson, VFF head of national operations and New Plymouth District Council candidate Tane Webster, Nelson City Council candidate Zoe Byrne, Whangārei District Council candidate Tracy Thomasson, and Tasman District Council candidate James Wolfen Duvall.

In early September 2022, Local Government NZ launched a campaign to help voters identify conspiracy theorists and extremists running for local government positions. Anti-misinformation group FACT Aotearoa had identified 170 candidates with extremist views or who were associated with anti-vaccination or anti-government groups. Massey University's Centre for Defence and Security Studies director Dr William Hoverd attributed the surge in "extremist" candidates to the occupation of the New Zealand Parliament's grounds during the 2022 Wellington protest, which in his view "had unified and galvanised groups with little in common other than their dissatisfaction with the Government."

Three Waters reform programme
Following the conclusion of the local elections in early October 2022, surveys conducted by the online media organisations Newsroom and The Spinoff found that a majority of elected mayors opposed the Government's Three Waters reform programme, a national water infrastructure programme that would take management of water assets and services away from local government bodies. While Newsroom survey of 220 newly-elected mayors and councillors found that 76% of respondents of 220 newly-elected mayors and councillors surveyed opposed the Three Water reforms, the Spinoff found that 43 of the 66 elected mayors surveyed opposed the reforms. Several newly-elected mayors including Mayor of Auckland Wayne Brown, Mayor of Invercargill Nobby Clark and Mayor of Nelson Nick Smith had campaigned against Three Waters during their mayoral races.

Vandalism
In mid August 2022, the Manawatu Standard reported that several hoardings featuring Labour candidates in Palmerston North including Lorna Johnson and Zulfiqar Butt had been vandalised. The Labour candidates lodged complaints with the Police.

In September 2022, there were reports of billboards and hoardings featuring Asian and Pacific Islander candidates being vandalised in the Auckland Region. The targeting of ethnic minority candidates' hoardings was condemned by Mayor of Auckland Phil Goff and Samoan New Zealander mayoral candidates Efeso Collins and Ted Johnston.

In mid September 2022, Stuff reported that hoardings featuring Nelson City Council Māori ward candidate Bernie Goldsmith were stolen, which the media company attributed to opposition to the Council's decision to adopt a Māori ward. In addition, hoardings featuring mayoral candidates Matt Lawrey and former National Party Member of Parliament Nick Smith were vandalised.

Elections 

 2022 Auckland local elections
 2022 Auckland mayoral election
 2022 Auckland local board elections
 2022 Christchurch local elections
 2022 Christchurch mayoral election
 2022 Dunedin local elections
 2022 Dunedin mayoral election
 2022 Hamilton mayoral election
 2022 Invercargill mayoral election
 2022 Rotorua mayoral election
 2022 Wellington local elections
 2022 Wellington City mayoral election
 2022 Chatham Islands mayoral election

Mayoral election summary

Regional council chairs

Notes

References 

Local elections in New Zealand
Local elections in New Zealand
Local elections